Ouachita Baptist University (OBU) is a private Baptist university in Arkadelphia, Arkansas. The university's name is taken from the Ouachita (pronounced WAH-shi-tah) River, which forms the eastern campus boundary. It is affiliated with the Arkansas Baptist State Convention, a state convention affiliated with the Southern Baptist Convention.

History
Ouachita Baptist University was founded as Ouachita Baptist College on September 6, 1886, and has operated continually since that date. It was originally located on the campus of Ouachita Baptist High School. Its current location is on the former campus of the Arkansas School for the Blind, which relocated to Little Rock.

The first president was J. W. Conger, who was elected to the post on June 22, 1886. The OBU Board of Trustees unanimously elected Dr. Ben Sells, former vice president for university advancement at Taylor University, as the sixteenth president of Ouachita Baptist University on April 7, 2016. Those who have served as president include J. W. Conger (1886–1907), Henry Simms Hartzog (1907–1911), R. G. Bowers (1911–1913), Samuel Young Jameson (1913–1916), Charles Ernest Dicken (1916–1926), Arthur B. Hill (1926–1929), Charles D. Johnson (1929–1933), James R. Grant (1933–1949), Seaford Eubanks (1949–1951), Harold A. Haswell (1952–1953), Ralph Arloe Phelps Jr. (1953–1969), Daniel R. Grant (1970–1988), Ben M. Elrod (1988–1998), Andrew Westmoreland (1998–2006) and Rex Horne (2006–2015).

In 1965 the college changed its name to Ouachita Baptist University. Recent years have seen a steady expansion of the campus, including the Harvey Jones Science Center (1997), the Frank D. Hickingbotham School of Business in Hickingbotham Hall (2006), the Student Village residence halls (2009) and Cliff Harris Stadium (2014).

Academics

Ouachita Baptist University focuses on undergraduate programs in the liberal arts. It offers 64 degree programs in eight academic schools: School of Interdisciplinary Studies, Frank D. Hickingbotham School of Business, Chesley and Elizabeth Pruet School of Christian Studies, Michael D. Huckabee School of Education, School of Fine Arts, W. H. Sutton School of Social Sciences, J. D. Patterson School of Natural Sciences, and School of Humanities. Most students earn a Bachelor of Arts (B.A.) degree, but the school also offers Bachelor of Science (B.S.), Bachelor of Music (B.M.), Bachelor of Music Education (B.M.E.), Bachelor of Fine Arts (B.F.A.) and Associate of Arts (A.A.) degrees. Study abroad programs are offered through the Grant Center for International Studies. Two classes in religion are part of the core curriculum and graduation requires seven credits of chapel (earned by regular chapel attendance during a semester).

OBU operates on the traditional credit hour system. The student-to-faculty ratio is approximately 12:1.

The university is accredited by the Higher Learning Commission with specific programs accredited by the Association to Advance Collegiate Schools of Business (AACSB International), National Council for the Accreditation of Teacher Education (NCATE), National Association for Schools of Music, the Commission on the Accreditation of Athletic Training Education Programs (CAATE), and the Commission on Accreditation for Dietetics Education (CADE) of the American Dietetic Association. There is a joint Reserve Officer Training Corps (ROTC) program with neighboring Henderson State University. The OBU ROTC program dates back to 1886.

The university was ranked #173 in the 2019 National Liberal Arts Colleges rankings by U.S. News & World Report.

Campus

Ouachita Baptist has an 85-acre main campus. There are eight academic buildings: Jones Performing Arts Center (which includes Verser Theatre), Moses–Provine Hall, Mabee Fine Arts Center, McClellan Hall, Lile Hall, Hickingbotham Hall, the Harvey Jones Science Center and the Berry Bible Building. The campus also houses a number of administrative buildings, two school libraries, conference centers, residence halls and a dining facility. OBU operates five off-campus apartment complexes for upperclassmen.

Student life

Ouachita is primarily a residential campus, with 94% percent of the students living in one of eight on-campus residence halls and five off-campus apartment complexes. Only students who have family in the area, are married or are over the age of 22 are allowed to live elsewhere. Campus policies restrict students visiting the rooms of those of the opposite sex to special visiting hours.

Ouachita does not allow nationally affiliated social fraternities or sororities, but there are local fraternities and sororities called "social clubs." Approximately 20% of the student body are members of such clubs. Annually, during Homecoming Weekend, the social clubs participate in a musical show called Tiger Tunes, produced by the Ouachita Student Foundation (OSF). All proceeds raised from Tiger Tunes and other events throughout the year are then given by OSF for student scholarships. Current men's social clubs are: Rho Sigma, Beta Beta, Kappa Chi, and Eta Alpha Omega. Current women's social clubs are: E.E.E., Chi Delta, Tri Chi, Chi Mu, and Gamma Phi.

In the spring, Tiger Traks invades the campus for two days of competition among students. Called "Arkansas' Most Exciting College Weekend," Tiger Traks invites all students and faculty to participate and raise funds for OSF scholarships. There are also more than 40 professional, departmental and honorary organizations for students. In addition, the Campus Activities Board offers concerts and movies, and the Office of Campus Ministries offers other activities and ministry opportunities for students.

The Signal is Ouachita's student newspaper and the Ouachitonian is the university's yearbook.

Athletics

OBU fields intercollegiate men's teams in baseball, basketball, football, soccer, swimming, tennis, cross country, and wrestling. Women's sports include basketball, cross country, soccer, softball, swimming, tennis and volleyball. The school mascot is the Tiger, and colors are purple and gold. As of fall 2011, Ouachita began competition in the Great American Conference, after previously being a member of the Gulf South Conference. The Great American Conference consists of six schools from Arkansas and 6 schools from Oklahoma. The football Tigers were the conference champions of the inaugural 2011 season as well as the 2014, 2017, 2018, and 2019 conference champions. In wrestling, a sport not sponsored by the GAC, OBU competes as a single-sport member of the Great Lakes Valley Conference.

Ouachita's men's tennis team earned four consecutive GAC tennis championships, women's soccer won the GAC championship in 2014 and 2021 and men's soccer won the inaugural GAC men's soccer championship in 2015. The men's basketball team has earned conference championships in 2013, 2015, and 2016.

In 2010, Ouachita Baptist was the first university in Arkansas to offer an NCAA wrestling program. Dallas Smith, a four-time All-American, earned the program's first national title at the NCAA Division II National Championships in 2015.

Ouachita has an intense crosstown rivalry with Henderson State University, a public university located across a small ravine from the Ouachita campus. The annual "Battle of the Ravine" between the two schools is the fifth-oldest football rivalry in college sports. The teams first met in 1895.

The Ouachita Tigers competed in national tournaments in men's basketball, swimming and wrestling in 2016. Other successful teams on the national level include the 2009 women's basketball team, reaching the Sweet 16 in the NCAA Division II Women's Basketball National Tournament, and the 2009 swimming teams, with the men's team finishing fifth in Division II and the women's team sixth. The 2008 Ouachita baseball team finished second in the NCAA Division II World Series.

Several intramural sports are also available for both men and women. These include football, basketball, softball, volleyball, dodgeball, innertube water polo and tennis.

Notable alumni

Music and the arts 

 Shelley Breen, Heather Payne, Denise Jones, and Terry Jones of Christian pop music group Point of Grace
 Steven Bryant – American composer and conductor for wind ensemble and orchestra, studied under W. Francis McBeth
 Russ Taff – former Gaither Vocal Band and The Imperials member and renowned soloist in the Southern gospel music industry
 Alan Thomas and Steven Rutherford of Joan

Public office 

 Winston Bryant – Attorney General of Arkansas, 1990 to 1999
 Mark Darr – Arkansas Lieutenant Governor between 2011–2014
 Gary Deffenbaugh – Retired educator and Republican member of the Arkansas House of Representatives from Crawford County
 Lance Eads – Republican member of the Arkansas House of Representatives for Washington County since 2015
 Jake Files – Republican state senator from Fort Smith; attended OBU but graduated from Arkansas State University with bachelor's degree in accounting
 Fonda Hawthorne – Democratic member of the Arkansas House of Representatives from Little River County since 2013
 William Holloway – Governor of Oklahoma, 1929 to 1931
 Jon Hubbard – former member of the Arkansas House of Representatives from Jonesboro
 Mike Huckabee – Governor of Arkansas from 1996 to 2007, 2008 and 2016 Republican President candidate
 Susan McDougal – involved in Whitewater controversy, author of The Woman Who Wouldn't Talk
 Bob C. Riley – Lieutenant Governor of Arkansas and interim Governor of Arkansas, decorated veteran of World War II
 Steve Russell - U.S. Representative from Oklahoma's 5th congressional district, 2015 to 2019, decorated veteran of Iraq
 David J. Sanders – Arkansas state senator from Pulaski County; former member of the Arkansas House of Representatives; Baptist education official in Little Rock
 Sarah Huckabee Sanders – former White House Press Secretary; Governor of Arkansas.
 Bryan Slaton – Republican member of the Texas House of Representatives for Hunt County
 Boyd Anderson Tackett – U.S. representative from Arkansas's 4th congressional district, 1949 to 1953
 Richard Womack – Republican member of the Arkansas House of Representatives for the 18th district since 2012

Sports 

 Linda Gamble – pioneer in women's basketball
 Cliff Harris – professional football player, 6 x All-Pro Dallas Cowboys safety (1970-1979), Hall of Fame inductee. 
 Travis Jackson – Baseball Hall of Fame shortstop for New York Giants in the 1920s and 1930s
 Gregory Junior – professional football player for the Jacksonville Jaguars; first player drafted from Ouachita Baptist into the NFL.
 William Miller – professional football player in the Canadian Football League and the USFL
 Alexander Myres – professional football player for the Detroit Lions 
 Ed Neal – an American football defensive tackle who played seven seasons for the Green Bay Packers in the National Football League
 Tommie Patterson – 2nd round draft pick (25th overall) and NBA player for the Washington Bullets (1972-1973)
 Julius Pruitt – a professional football wide receiver for the Miami Dolphins (2009 to 2012)
 Steve Roberts – former Head football coach at Southern Arkansas University, Northwestern State University, and Arkansas State University
 Phillip Supernaw – NFL player
 Aaron Ward – infielder for New York Yankees (1917–26), Chicago White Sox (1927) and Cleveland Indians (1928)

Education 
Doak S. Campbell – president of Florida State College for Women (1941–1947) and then Florida State University (1947–1957)
Leon Green – noted legal scholar, dean of Northwestern University School of Law
Andrew Westmoreland – 18th president of Samford University in Birmingham, Alabama

Nonprofit leadership 

Chad Griffin – former president of Human Rights Campaign

Armed services 

John H. Yancey - highly decorated United States Marine

See also
Southern Baptist Convention
Arkansas Baptist State Convention
List of Southern Baptist Convention affiliated people

References

External links
 
 Ouachita Baptist Tigers website

 
Liberal arts colleges in Arkansas
Arkadelphia, Arkansas
Baptist Christianity in Arkansas
Buildings and structures in Arkadelphia, Arkansas
Education in Clark County, Arkansas
1886 establishments in Arkansas
Educational institutions established in 1886
Universities and colleges affiliated with the Southern Baptist Convention
Private universities and colleges in Arkansas
Universities and colleges accredited by the Higher Learning Commission